Afshin Molavi is an Iranian-American author and expert on global geo-political risk and geo-economics, particularly the Middle East and Asia. He is co-director of the Emerge85 Lab, a joint research initiative between the Johns Hopkins Foreign Policy Institute and UAE-based Delma Institute. He is a senior research fellow at both the New America Foundation and Johns Hopkins University Paul H. Nitze School of Advanced International Studies, as well as a senior advisor at Oxford Analytica. At New America, he is co-director of the World Economy Roundtable, an exercise to re-map the global economy in the wake of The Great Recession.

In 2005, he was selected by the World Economic Forum in Davos as a 'Young Global Leader', by a committee of 28 international media leaders chaired by Queen Rania of Jordan.

Life and career
Molavi holds a master's degree in Middle Eastern history and international economics from the Johns Hopkins University Paul H. Nitze School of Advanced International Studies, where he also studied Arabic.

A former Dubai-based correspondent for the Reuters news agency, Tehran-based correspondent for The Washington Post, Riyadh-based business and economics writer for the Arab News, and Washington-based contributor to the Financial Times, Molavi has written widely on the Middle East, US regional policy, geo-economic trends in the Middle East and Asia, and globalization for a wide range of international publications.

His articles and op-eds have appeared in The New York Times, Foreign Affairs, National Geographic, BusinessWeek, The New Republic, Foreign Policy, Institutional Investor, the Journal of Commerce, and The Wilson Quarterly. He wrote the 2007 National Geographic cover story on Dubai, entitled "Sudden City." Molavi writes regularly for the Abu Dhabi-based newspaper, The National.

Previously, Molavi worked at International Finance Corporation, the private-sector development arm of the World Bank, where he headed civil and media outreach for the Middle East/North Africa and Southern Europe/Central Asia regions.

As a fellow at the New America Foundation, Molavi studies the geo-politics and geo-economics of the Middle East and Asia, as well as the links between economic development and democratization. He is currently studying the economic implications of "the Arab Spring." He is also examining the "New Silk Road" — the growing trade, cultural, diplomatic, and business ties between the Middle East and Asia. Molavi is also interested in issues related to global economic development, globalization and culture, and the economics of immigration.

He has described "The New Silk Road" at a conference at the Woodrow Wilson International Center for Scholars on China and the Persian Gulf region, at a World Bank Seminar entitled the East-East Corridor, in an article in The Washington Post entitled "The New Silk Road",  and in the pages of The National, where he wrote about "the meeting of West Asia and East Asia."

Molavi's analyses of the 2009 Iranian presidential election, in which he believes massive fraud took place, were frequently quoted in the media. He praises the Iranian Constitution of 1906 as progressive and calls for American civil society support for Iranians struggling for freedom.

Molavi frequently supports Iranian-American civic outreach and youth programs. He has publicly supported the Public Affairs Alliance of Iranian Americans (PAAIA). He was a keynote speaker in 2012 at an annual PAAIA event for the "next generation of leaders".

Books
Molavi is the author of Persian Pilgrimages: Journeys Across Iran (Norton 2002), which was published in paperback under the title, The Soul of Iran (Norton, 2005). The book was dubbed by Foreign Affairs "a brilliant tableau of today's Iran" and made the list of Fareed Zakaria's CNN GPS recommended books to read on foreign policy.

References 

Iranian journalists
Living people
World Bank Group people
Year of birth missing (living people)